The women's individual competition at the 2002 Asian Games in Busan was held on 10 October 2002.

Schedule
All times are Korea Standard Time (UTC+09:00)

Results

Shooting

Fencing

Swimming

Riding

Running

Summary

References 

2002 Asian Games Report, Pages 502–513

External links 
Results

Modern pentathlon at the 2002 Asian Games